Longa River can mean:

 Longa River (Angola)
 Longá River in Brazil